In 2005, the literacy rate in Laos was estimated to be 73% (83% male and 63% female).

The Human Rights Measurement Initiative (HRMI) finds that Laos is fulfilling only 74.0% of what it should be fulfilling for the right to education based on the country's level of income. HRMI breaks down the right to education by looking at the rights to both primary education and secondary education. While taking into consideration Laos' income level, the nation is achieving 84.0% of what should be possible based on its resources (income) for primary education but only 64.0% for secondary education.

Education before the Lao People's Democratic Republic
Of the many ethnic groups in Laos, only the Lao Loum had a tradition of formal education, reflecting the fact that the languages of the other groups had no written script. Until the mid-20th century, education was primarily based in the Buddhist temple school (wat school), where the monks taught novices and other boys to read both Lao and Pali scripts, basic arithmetic, and other religious and social subjects. Many villages had wat schools for novices and other village boys. However, only ordained boys and men in urban monasteries had access to advanced study.

During the colonial period, the French established a secular education system patterned after schools in France, and French was the language of instruction after the second or third grade. This system was largely irrelevant to the needs and lifestyles of the vast majority of the rural population, despite its extension to some district centers and a few villages. However, it did produce a small elite drawn primarily from the royal family and noble households. Many children of Vietnamese immigrants to Laos—who made up the majority of the colonial civil service—attended these schools and, in fact, constituted a significant proportion of the students at secondary levels in urban centers.

Post-secondary education was not available in Laos, and the few advanced students traveled to Hanoi, Danang, and Hué in Vietnam and to Phnom Penh in Cambodia for specialized training; fewer still continued with university-level studies in France.

The Pathet Lao began to provide Lao language instruction in the schools under its control in the late 1950s, and a Laotian curriculum began to be developed in the late 1960s in the RLG schools. In 1970 about one-third of the civilian employees of the RLG were teachers, although the majority of these were poorly paid and minimally trained elementary teachers. At that time, there were about 200,000 elementary students enrolled in RLG schools, around 36 percent of the school-age population.

Education since 1975
An important goal of the Lao People's Democratic Republic (LPDR) government was to establish a system of universal primary education by 1985. The LPDR took over the existing Royal Lao Government education system that had been established in 1950s and restructured it, facing many of the same problems that had confronted previous governments. The French system of education was replaced with a Laotian curriculum, although lack of teaching materials has impeded effective instruction.

An intensive adult literacy campaign was initiated in 1983-84, which mobilized educated persons living in villages and urban neighborhoods to bring basic reading and writing skills to over 750,000 adults. Largely as a result of this campaign, those able to read and write had increased to an estimated 44 percent. According to the United Nations, by 1985 those able to read and write were estimated at 92 percent of men and 76 percent of women ages 15 to 45. Because few reading materials are available, especially in the rural areas, many newly literate adults lose much of their proficiency after a few years.

The decision to establish universal education led the government to focus its efforts on building and staffing schools in nearly every village. Because resources are limited, most schools are poorly constructed—of bamboo and thatch—and staffed by one or two teachers who are paid low wages, usually in arrears. Many village schools have only one or two grades; books, paper, or other teaching materials are conspicuous by their scarcity.

School enrollment has increased since 1975. In 1988 primary school enrollment was estimated at 63 percent of all school-age children. In 1992-93 an estimated 603,000 students were in primary school, compared to 317,000 students in 1976 and 100,000 students in 1959. However, the goal of achieving universal primary education was postponed from 1985 to 2000 as a result of the lack of resources.

Because teachers are paid irregularly, they are forced to spend significant amounts of time farming or in other livelihood activities, with the result that in many locations classes are  held for only a few hours a day. Because of irregular classes, overcrowding, and lack of learning resources, the average student needed 11 to 12 years to complete the five-year primary course in the late 1980s. Repetition rates ranged from 40 percent for the first grade to 14 percent for the fifth grade. Dropouts were a significant problem, with 22 percent of all entering first graders leaving school before the second grade. In the late 1980s, only 45 percent of entering first graders completed all five years of primary school, up from 18 percent in 1969.

Performance statistics vary according to rural-urban location, ethnic group, and gender. Enrollment and school quality are higher in urban areas, where the usefulness of a formal education is more evident than in rural farming communities. Isolated teachers confronted with primitive rural living and teaching conditions have a difficult time maintaining their own commitment as well as the interest of their pupils. Ethnic minority students who have no tradition of literacy and who do not speak Lao have a particularly difficult time. Unless the teacher is of the same or similar ethnic group as the students, communication and culturally appropriate education are limited. Because of these factors, in the late 1980s the enrollment rate for the Lao Sung was less than half that of the Lao Loum; enrollment was also low fofr Lao Theung children.

Girls are less likely than boys to attend school and attend for fewer years—a discrepancy that was declining, however, in the early 1990s. In 1969 only 37 percent of students in primary school were girls; by 1989, however, 44 percent of primary school students were girls. Because of Lao Sung cultural attitudes toward girls' and women's responsibilities, girls in these groups accounted for only 26 percent of all students.

Secondary education enrollment has expanded since 1975 but as of mid-1994 was still limited in availability and scope. In 1992-93 only about 130,000 students were enrolled in all postprimary programs, including lower- and upper-secondary schools, vocational programs, and teacher-training schools. The exodus of Laotian elite after 1975 deprived vocational and secondary schools of many of their staff, a situation that was only partly offset by students returning from training in socialist countries. Between 1975 and 1990, the government granted over 14,000 scholarships for study in at least eight socialist countries: just over 7,000 were to the Soviet Union, followed by 2,500 to Vietnam, and 1,800 to the German Democratic Republic (East Germany).

In mid-1994 the school year was nine months. The ideal sequence included five years of primary school, followed by three years of lower-secondary school and three years of upper-secondary school. In 2010, another year was added to upper-secondary school, for a total of 12 years of primary and secondary education. Some students go directly from primary or lower-secondary school to vocational instruction, for example, in teacher-training schools or agriculture schools.

Local secondary education is concentrated in the provincial capitals and some district centers. Dropout rates for students at secondary and technical schools are not as high as among primary students, but the gender and ethnic group differentials are more pronounced. In the late 1980s, only 7% of lower-secondary students were Lao Sung or Lao Theung, a rate that dropped to 3% in upper-secondary school. For most students who do not live in a provincial center, attendance at secondary school requires boarding away from home in makeshift facilities. This situation further discourages students in rural areas from pursuing further education, with additional differential impacts on girls and minorities. Vientiane has the majority of advanced schools, including the national teachers' training school at Dong Dok, the irrigation college at Tad Thong, the agriculture college at Na Phok, the National Polytechnic Institute, and the University of Medical Sciences. Even so, the level of training available at these schools is low.

In 1986 the government began to reform the education system, with the goals of linking educational development more closely to the socioeconomic situation in each locality, improving science training and emphasis, expanding networks to remote mountainous regions, and recruiting minority teachers. The plan envisioned making education more relevant to daily realities and building increased cooperation in educational activities among the ministries, mass organizations, and the community. However, the ability to implement this program through its scheduled completion in 2000 depended on a significant budgetary increase to the education sector in addition to receiving significant foreign aid. Education accounted for only 8 percent of government expenditures in 1988, down from a 10% to 15% range during the preceding seven-year period, and cultural expenditures were not accorded a high priority.

Although more school texts and general magazines are being printed, poor distribution systems and budgetary constraints limit their availability throughout the country. Overall, 3.9 million books were printed in 1989, including school texts published by the Ministry of Education, and novels, stories, and poems published by the Ministry of Information and Culture. Translations into Lao of Russian-language technical, literary, and children's books were available through the Novosti press agency. Virtually all these materials are inexpensive paperbound editions. 

Distribution of school texts is improving, and magazines and novels can occasionally be found in district markets distant from Vientiane. Thai printed material—for the most part, magazines and books—was available after the late 1980s in a few shops. Yet, in the early 1990s, it was rare to see a book or any other reading material in rural villages, with the exception of political posters or a months-old edition of the newspaper Xieng Pasason ("Voice of the People") pasted on a house wall.

Education in Laos (post-1990)
Refer to page Education in Laos (post-1990) for updated education information.

Development challenge in Laos’s education system

The Lao population of 7.5 million is ethnically and linguistically diverse. The government has defined 50 ethnic groups, many having their own language. School attendance, literacy, and other indicators of educational attainment vary greatly among different ethnic groups. Census data from 1995 reveal that 23 percent of the Lao never went to school as compared with 34, 56, and 67 percent for Phutai, Khmu, and Hmong. Among two of the smallest ethnic groups, 94 percent of the Kor and 96 percent of the Musir never attended school. The quality of instruction tends to be poor, and nearly half of those who enter do not complete the primary cycle.

Lao, the official and instructional language, is the first language of about 50 percent of the population. Children from homes where Lao is not spoken enter schools with a significant handicap, a condition partly accounting for the high dropout rate. Changing the language of instruction would be a complex problem; however, steps can be taken by schools to assist non-Lao speaking pupils.

The rural quality of Laos implicates the provision of education as urbanization facilitates educational delivery. It is more expensive to provide schools for each small village than to build a smaller number of large schools in cities. These rural-urban differences are even more significant for provision of secondary, technical or vocational schools given the higher unit costs involved.  The quantity and quality of schooling are influenced by demographic structures and are highly sensitive to the size of the school-age cohort. 

The extremely young population of Lao PDR puts a heavy burden on schooling and, at the same time, the high dependency ratio contributes to the low national productivity. Large families force choices as to which children go to school, tending to suppress female enrollments and indirectly reducing the number of subsequent opportunities for girls in education and in the labor market.

The education system is evolving under severely constraining conditions of inadequately prepared and poorly paid teachers, insufficient funding, shortages of facilities, and often ineffective allocation of the limited resources available. There is significant geographic, ethnic, gender and wealth disparities in the distribution of educational services, and inequalities exist in every level of the system.

References

Bibliography
Evans, Grant. 1998. The politics of ritual and remembrance: Laos since 1975. Honolulu: University of Hawaii Press.
Evans, Grant. 2002. Crowns Nest, NSW: Allen & Unwin.
Faming, Manynooch. 2007. "Schooling in the Lao People's Democratic Republic" in Going to school in East Asia, edited by Gerard A. Postiglione and Jason Tan. Westport,Conn. ; London : Greenwood Press (pp: 170-206). 
Faming, Manynooch. 2008. National Integration: Education for Ethnic Minorities in Laos. Ph.D. Thesis, Hong Kong: University of Hong Kong.
Fry, Gerald W. 2002. "Laos—Education System" in Encyclopedia of Modern Asia, edited by David Levinson and Karen Christensen. New York : Charles Scribner's Group : Thomson/Gale.

External links
 Laos School Directory
Education in Laos summary